The Cobberas Range, a mountain range that is part of the Great Dividing Range within the Victorian Alps, is located in north-eastern Victoria in Australia. The range is located in the Cobberas Wilderness area of the Alpine National Park.

Peaks include:
Mount Cobberas No. 1, at 
Mount Cobberas No. 2
Moscow Peak
Middle Peak
Cleft Peak

In January 1854, Victorian Government Botanist Ferdinand von Mueller passed through the area on the second of his three expeditions to the Alps. He collected many plants, many of which had not been previously recorded.

See also

 Alpine National Park
 List of mountains in Victoria

References

Alpine National Park
Great Dividing Range